Stefanie Schuster (born 19 April 1969 in Oberstdorf) is an Austrian former alpine skier who competed in the 1994 Winter Olympics and 1998 Winter Olympics.

External links
 sports-reference.com

1969 births
Living people
Austrian female alpine skiers
Olympic alpine skiers of Austria

Alpine skiers at the 1994 Winter Olympics
Alpine skiers at the 1998 Winter Olympics
People from Oberstdorf
Sportspeople from Swabia (Bavaria)